Cyrus is a surname. Notable people with the surname include:

Ron Cyrus (1935–2006), Kentucky politician, and his descendants:
 Second generation:
Billy Ray Cyrus (born 1961), American musician and actor (son)
 Third generation:
Trace Cyrus (born 1989), American musician; (former) lead guitarist of Metro Station (son of Billy Ray)
Miley Cyrus (born 1992), American actress and singer (daughter of Billy Ray)
Noah Cyrus (born 2000), American actress (daughter of Billy Ray)
Tish Cyrus (born 1967), co-presenter of Cyrus vs. Cyrus: Design and Conquer 
Brandi Cyrus (born 1987), co-presenter of Cyrus vs. Cyrus: Design and Conquer
David Cyrus (born 1989), Grenadian international footballer
Gordon Cyrus, Swedish performer and record producer